William Cotesworth of Gateshead (1668 – 1726) was an English merchant and government official who served as sheriff of Northumberland. 

Based in Newcastle, Cotesworth was the son of a yeoman.  He was a cousin of London politician William Cotesworth.   As a young man, Cotesworth was apprenticed to a tallow candle maker.

As a merchant, Cotesworth collected tallow in England and sold it internationally. He imported dyes from Southeast Asia, as well as flax, wine, and grain from other regions . Cotesworth sold tea, sugar, chocolate, and tobacco, operated the largest coal mines in the area, and was a leading salt producer. 

Over time, Cotesworth became the English government's principal agent in Northern England, being in contact with leading royal ministers.   He became an esquire, having served as mayor, justice of the peace and sheriff of Northumberland.

Notes

Further reading
 Ellis, Joyce. "A bold adventurer: the business fortunes of William Cotesworth, c. 1668-1726." Northern History 17.1 (1981): 117–132.
 Ellis, Joyce. "The Poisoning of William Cotesworth, 1725." History Today (Nov 1978), 28#11, pp 752–757.
 Ellis, Joyce M. "A study of the business fortunes of William Cotesworth, c. 1668-1726". (PhD Diss. University of Oxford, 1976) online
 Outhwaite, R. B. "Merchants and Gentry in North-East England, 1650-1830: The Carrs and the Ellisons." English Historical Review 115.462 (2000): 729-729.

17th-century English merchants